The Play-offs of the 2003 Fed Cup Americas Zone Group I were the final stages of the Group I Zonal Competition involving teams from the Americas. Those that qualified for this stage placed first and second in their respective pools.

The four teams were then paired up the team from a different placing of the other group for a play-off tie, with the winners being promoted to the World Group Play-offs.

Canada vs. El Salvador

  advanced to the World Group Play-offs, where they were drawn against . They lost 1–4, and thus were relegated back to Group I for 2004.

Mexico vs. Brazil

  advanced to the World Group Play-offs, where they were drawn against . They lost 1–4, and thus were relegated back to Group I for 2004.

See also
Fed Cup structure

References

External links
 Fed Cup website

2003 Fed Cup Americas Zone